Adolf Froelich (December 24, 1887 – November 1943) was a Polish inventor, dentist and participant in the Polish-Soviet War.

Curriculum vitae 

Adolf Froelich was born in Łaziska, Opole Lubelskie County, Poland, to parents Reinhold Froelich and Antonina Wilhelmina Józefina Froelich (née Majewska).
He studied brewing technology at the scientific department Weihenstephan of the Technical University of Munich in Freising. Furthermore, he studied dentistry. He got his dentist approbation in 1918. As a dentist he worked inter alia in Jędrzejów.
In 1932 he invented the double propeller.
He was officer (rank: lieutenant) of the Polish Armed Forces. As a dentist he took part in the Polish-Soviet War being a member of the 9th Infantry Division. He died in Warsaw.

Bibliography
 Urząd Patentowy Rzeczpospolitej Polskiej Opis Patentowy Nr 18229, Warszawa 21 sierpnia 1933, Adolf Froelich, Podwójne śmigło.

Notes

1887 births
1943 deaths
20th-century Polish inventors
Polish dentists
20th-century dentists